Mynette Louie is an American film producer of Chinese descent. She was nominated for a Primetime Emmy and Critics Choice Award in 2018 for HBO's The Tale, won the 2015 Independent Spirit Awards John Cassavetes Award for Land Ho!, and won the 2013 Independent Spirit Awards Piaget Producers Award. She was also nominated twice for "Best First Feature" at the Independent Spirit Awards for I Carry You With Me and The Tale. She is a member of the Academy of Motion Picture Arts and Sciences.

Background
Louie was born in Manhattan, New York to working-class immigrant parents from Hong Kong and China. She was raised in Brooklyn and Honolulu, and graduated from Hunter College High School and Harvard University.

Career
After working in marketing and business development at Time Magazine, Jupiter Communications, and SportsIllustrated.com, Louie learned producing by producing NYU Tisch graduate thesis films, though she did not attend the school.

Louie has premiered eight feature films at the Sundance Film Festival: Heidi Ewing's I Carry You With Me, Jennifer Fox's The Tale starring Laura Dern, Isabelle Nélisse, Ellen Burstyn, Jason Ritter, Elizabeth Debicki, and Common; Christina Choe's Nancy starring Andrea Riseborough, J Smith Cameron, Steve Buscemi, Ann Dowd, and John Leguizamo, Hannah Fidell's "The Long Dumb Road" starring Tony Revolori and Jason Mantzoukas; So Yong Kim's Lovesong starring Riley Keough and Jenna Malone; Martha Stephens & Aaron Katz's Land Ho! starring Paul Eenhoorn (Sundance 2014, Sony Pictures Classics, Spirit Award nominee); Marshall Lewy's California Solo starring Robert Carlyle (Sundance 2012, Strand Releasing); and Tze Chun's Children of Invention starring Cindy Cheung (Sundance 2009).

Her films have also premiered or screened at the New York Film Festival, Toronto International Film Festival, Venice Critics Week, SXSW, Tribeca Film Festival, Los Angeles Film Festival, Locarno Film Festival, London Film Festival, and Berlin Film Festival.

Her first feature was Andrew Bujalski's critically acclaimed Mutual Appreciation (SXSW 2005), which she co-produced. Louie also produced or executive produced Aaron Katz's Gemini starring Lola Kirke, Zoë Kravitz and John Cho (SXSW 2017, NEON), Sarah Adina Smith's Buster's Mal Heart starring Rami Malek (Toronto 2016), Natalia Garagiola's Temporada de Caza (Hunting Season) (Venice Critics Week 2017, Grand Prize), Lauren Wolkstein & Christopher Radcliff's The Strange Ones (SXSW 2017), Karyn Kusama's The Invitation (SXSW 2015), Jamie Babbit's Addicted to Fresno (SXSW 2015), Patricia Benoit's Stones in the Sun starring Edwidge Danticat (Tribeca 2012, Special Jury Prize, Best Narrative Director), Doug Karr's Art Machine (Woodstock 2012), Ishai Setton's The Kitchen (Gen Art 2012, Closing Night), Olivia Silver's Arcadia starring John Hawkes (Berlin 2012, Crystal Bear Winner), and Tze Chun's Cold Comes the Night starring Alice Eve, Logan Marshall-Green, and Bryan Cranston (Sony/Goldwyn 2014).

Louie previously served as the president of Gamechanger Films, a financing company that invested in women-directed narrative features.

Louie also worked in economic development at the Hawaii Film Office, where she authored the state's refundable production tax credit and oversaw the renovation of the state-owned film studio. She was named one of Business Insider's "12 Movie Producers to Watch in 2020 and Beyond," listed as one of Ted Hope's "21 Brave Thinkers of Truly Free Film" for the distribution strategy of Children of Invention, profiled in Indiewire's "Futures" column and in Crain's New York Business, and named one of Indiewire's "100 Filmmakers to Follow on Twitter." She serves on the Board of Directors of Film Independent, and as an advisor to the Sundance Institute, SXSW, IFP, and A3 Asian American Artists Foundation. Her production company The Population signed a deal with Topic Studios more recently.

Louie was invited to become a member of the Academy of Motion Picture Arts and Sciences in 2016. She is also an Assistant Professor of Professional Practice in the graduate film producing program at Columbia University School of the Arts.

Producing filmography 
 Mutual Appreciation (2006) – Co-Producer
 Children of Invention (2009) – Producer
 California Solo (2012) – Producer
 Arcadia (2012) – Consulting Producer
 Stones in the Sun (2012) – Producer
 The Kitchen (2012) – Executive Producer
 Art Machine (2012) – Producer
 Cold Comes the Night (2014) – Producer, Second Unit Director
 Land Ho! (2014) – Producer
 Addicted to Fresno (2015) - Executive Producer
 The Invitation (2015) – Executive Producer
 Lovesong (2016) - Executive Producer
 Buster's Mal Heart (2016) - Executive Producer
 Gemini (2017) - Producer
 The Strange Ones (2017) - Executive Producer
 Hunting Season (2018) - Co-Producer
 The Tale (2018) - Producer
 Nancy (2018) - Executive Producer
 The Long Dumb Road (2018) - Executive Producer
 Swallow (2019) - Producer
 Black Box (2020) - Executive Producer
 I Carry You With Me (2021) - Producer
 Catch the Fair One (2022) - Executive Producer

References 

American film producers
Harvard University alumni
Hunter College High School alumni
American people of Chinese descent
People from Brooklyn
People from Honolulu
Living people
Year of birth missing (living people)